Trandumskogen is a forest located in Ullensaker, Akershus county, Norway.   It was the site of one of the first discoveries in May 1945 of German mass graves in Norway. The German executioner Oskar Hans was the officer in command of the unit performing the executions.

In total 173 Norwegians, 6 British and 15 Soviet citizens were executed in Trandumskogen. Many had been sentenced to death by the German occupation forces, but there was also a great number who were subject to arbitrary executions. After the Second World War, Norwegian citizens sentenced for treason, and leading members of the Norwegian national socialist party Nasjonal Samling were forced to open the graves and exhume the bodies of the executed prisoners. The medical identification of the corps was led by professor in forensic medicine Georg Waaler, assisted by dentist Ferdinand Strøm.

From May 5, 2020, Trandumskogen is protected as a national cultural heritage site.

Memorial
On 10 October 1954, the memorial in Trandumskogen was unveiled. Crown Prince Olav stood for the ceremony. Per Palle Storm, artist and sculptor and professor at the National Art Academy had carried out the artistic part of the work. The memorial is carved of light Granite (Iddefjordgranitt). To the south side an inscription is carved in Norwegian. The same text translated into Russian is cut into the east side and in English to the west side. The memorial is located south of the burial ground. The memorial lists the names of those who were executed there. The memorial has status as a Norwegian national memorial.

The text on the memorial reads:
IN THE COMBAT FOR FREEDOMDURING THE 1940-1945 WAR173 NORWEGIANS 15 SOVJET-SUBJECTS AND 6 BRITONS WEREHERE IN THE WOODS OF TRAN-DUM EXECUTED BY THE ENEMY

The names of those executed at Trandumskogen

Grave 1, 1 March 1943
Arthur Oskar Berg from Odda
Bjarne Dalland from Bergen
Daniel Theodor Danielsen from Voss
Thor Gerotti Espelid from Odda
Ole Kjell Karlsen from Oslo
Leif Arnoldus Kindem from Odda
Ingolf Kleppestø from Odda
Olav Kvernmo from Oslo
Ottar Lie from Oslo
Gustav Adolf Neråsen from Øyer
Lars Nordbø from Oslo
Olaf Prestegaard from Odda
Harald Andreas Gerotti Slåttelid from Odda
Arne Stensrud from Oslo
Reidar Svendsen from Oslo
Sigurd Syvertsen from Krokstadelva
Knut Veka from Odda

Grave 2, 3 September 1943
Marius Nikolai Karlsen from Skjervøy
Hillfl David Lie from Oslo
Karsten Løvestad from Trøgstad

Grave 3, 30 October 1944
Nicolai Bachilin from the Soviet Union
Jacob Brunelin from the Soviet Union
Jacob Magnus Frøyland from Farsund
Fedor Getnikow from the Soviet Union
Eyolf Haug from Kongsberg
Odd Trygve Christiansen from Fagernes
Audun Lavik from Lyngdal
Michael Lotikow from the Soviet Union
Vladimir Medownikow from the Soviet Union
Sverre Emil Narvesen from Modum
Thormod Johannes Nygaard from Oslo
Gunnar Onshuus from Sandefjord
Simon Peachawow from the Soviet Union
Rolf Edvin Pettersen from Drammen
Borti Reichelt from Kragerø
Boris Resnick from the Soviet Union
Hugo Rossnes from Oslo
Reidar Steen Olsen from Sandefjord
Olaf Strand from Bergen
Per Rolf Syvertsen
Karl Ludvig Sørensen from Sandefjord
Patike Tschikidse from the Soviet Union

Grave 4, 30 April 1942
Leif Bye Nielsen from Oslo
Arne Grønn Disch from Tønsberg
Ole Elias Dyrøy from Borgund
Harald Bølerud from Oslo
Per Andreas Fillinger from Oslo
Jakob Otto Friis from Oslo
Andreas Gjertsen from Oslo
Leonard Godager from Furnes
Ole Kjeldserg from Nordstrand
Alfred Waldemar Garmann Larsen from Oslo
Ole Arntzen Lutzow Holm from Oslo
Einar Oliver Mjølhus from Hjelmland
Jesper Kjell Næss from Odal
Bjarne Fillip Olsen from Ålesund
Magnus Tuntland from Hjelmland
Peter Kristian Boe Young from Oslo
Birger Aasland from Hjelmland
Kåre Angell Elgenes from Molde (executed 1 May)

Grave 6, 5 September 1944
Kristian Andresen from Gjøvik
Fedor Barkow from the Soviet Union
Finn Brede Bråthen from Modum
Peter Christensen from Oslo
Arne Reidar Gustavsen from Drammen
Reinhard Halvorsen from Norderhov
Petter Albert Hammerø from Oslo
Reidar Hansen from Norderhov
Åge Hansen from Oslo
Daniel Jacowitz from the Soviet Union
Ove Jensen from Asker
Georg Johannes Jenserud from Norderhov
Martin Kleppan from Oslo
Johan Karelius Moen from Norderhov
Helge Olsen from Norderhov
Kåre Pettersen from Drammen
Stephan Pleschatschew from the Soviet Union
Wasil Sacharschenko from the Soviet Union
Gunnar K Skinstad from Modum
Gjermund Karl Skaarud from Oslo
Per Thore Stensrud from Oslo
Alexander Szeinzuk from the Soviet Union
Benani Tschikikow from the Soviet Union

Grave 7, 3 June 1944
Gunnar Hanssen from Oslo
Kaare Hexeberg from Nittedal
Oskar Haakon Johannessen from Nittedal
Per Grell Lønning from Oslo
Odd Næss from Oslo

Grave 8, 25/26 May 1944

25 May 1944
Hans Skjærvø from Osen
Georg Stokke from Oslo

26 May 1944
Thore Eugen Sentzen from Svanvik in Sør-Varanger
Magnus Dahlen from Fåberg
Lars Emil Erichsen from Oslo
John Hatland from Oslo
Frederik Wilhelm Holter from Oslo
Odvar Jacobsen from Oslo
Leif Richard Johansen from Oslo
Harald Reitan from Oslo
Per Arne Stranger Thorsen from Oslo
Sven Olav Vogt from Oslo

Grave 9, Unknown date
F. Bonner from the United Kingdom
J. N. Blackburn from the United Kingdom
R. P. Evans from the United Kingdom
W. Jackson from the United Kingdom
J. Walsh from the United Kingdom
T. W. White from the United Kingdom

Grave 10, 2/3 March 1943

2. March 1943
Johan Peter Bruun from Oslo
Haakon Marius Sunde from Kopervik

3 March 1943
Ragnar Alf Anderson from Nesodden
Osmund Lindgård Brønnum from Oslo
Arne Gunnestad from Asker
Kaare Bjørn Jensen from Oslo
Thorleif Krogh from Oslo
Jacob Dybcad Sømme from Oslo
Lorentz Helge Aarnes from Oslo

Grave 11, 13/14 October

13 October 1943
Anders Johansen Krok from Mjøndalen
Erling Christian Marthinson from Eidsvåg i Åsane

14 October 1943
Thomas Henry Thornau Agnæs from Drammen
Sverre Andersen from Oslo
Reidar Furu from Drammen
Aksel Eugen Grønholdt from Oslo
Kaare Gundersen from Oslo
Sverre Emil Halvorsen from Oslo
Sigurd Jacobsen from Oslo
Alv Johan Johnsen from Drammen
Arthur Simensen from Nedre Eiker
Emil Gustav Hvaal from Sem
Lars Elias Telle from Sund
Olaf Østerud from Oslo
Christian Fredrik Fasting Aall from Fana

Grave 12, 21 May 1943
Anton Bø from Nærbø
Olaf Ege from Vigrestad
Karl Hellestø from Sola
Jørstein Johannesen from Time
Magnus Mæland from Mæland
Martin Opstad from Bø
Ingvar Ree from Nærbø
Ole Rosland from Time
Torgeir Sikvaland from Time
Augustus Stensland from Time
Andreas Steinsland from Time
Ragnvald Torland from Torland
Trygve Varden from Vigrestad
Arne Vigre from Nærbø
Sverre Valdeland from Valdeland

Grave 13, 4 July 1944
Ovin Christoffer Bronsta from Drammen
Jan Segelcke Koren from Oslo
Gay Børre Kristiansen from Kristiansand
Alf Leonard Lande from Nøtterøy
Per Nannestad Lindaas from Oslo
Tomas Per Trægde from Drammen
Olav Josef Wetterstad from Kongsberg

Grave 14, 7 September 1942
Haakon Eriksen from Oslo
Bjarne Hansen from Nedre Eiker
Eli(as) Skjold Hansen from Oslo
Karl Johan Jacobsen from Oslo
Alf Kristiansen from Drammen
Reidar Kristoffersen from Krokstadelva
Karl Frithjof Schei from Nes på Romerike

Grave 15, 12 August 1942
Poul Kvamme from Bergen
Unknown from the Soviet Union

Grave 16, 28 June 1943
Ragnar Fredriksen from Kristiansand
Erling Karlsen from Oddernes

Grave 17, 9/10 May 1944

9. May 1944
Arnt Andersen from Stavanger
Arne Thurin Bjørge from Arendal
Leif Dahl from Slagen
Olav Dyvik from Grimstad
Arthur Valdemar Emanuelsen from Stavanger
Johan Alfred Gøranson from Oppegård
Knut Haugneland from Stavanger
Martin August Johannesen from Egersund
Henry Victor Larsen from Stavanger
Arne Laudal from Kristiansand
Georg Osnes from Stavanger
Rolf Olav Schulstad from Oslo

10 May 1944
Knut Bø from Bygland
Magnus Nielsen from Hetland
Ingvald Georg Nordbø from Stavanger
Lars Sandvik from Kvinneherad
Torleif Tellefsen from Grimstad
Ferdinand Tjemsland from Stavanger
Aanund Tveit from Vestre Moland

Grave 18, Flatnermoen, 29 December 1941
Borgen Bøe from Stavanger
Karluf John Hans Bø from Stavanger
Georg Fjeldberg from Hjelmeland
Thomas Fjermstad from Stavanger
Georg Helland from Stavanger
Einar Hoseth from Stavanger
Martin Jacobsen from Stavanger
John Nilsen from Hetland
Carl Johan Oftedahl from Stavanger
Olav Ragnvald Olsson from Hetland
Arnt Plesner-Pedersen from Stavanger

In May 2021, Forsvarsbygg cut down the trees in the forest causing widespread condemnation. This action resulted in a criminal complaint which is as of June 2021, still under investigation.

2021 investigation of agency's tree-cutting at the heritage site
 
In 2021, Forsvarsbygg cut down trees in the forest. On 2 June the county of Viken ordered that the cutting must stop; the mayor of Ullensaker filed a police report. The Cabinet ordered a fact-finding commission regarding what had happened and how to prevent similar events at similar sites, according to the minister of defence.

As of June 2021, the tree-cutting at the heritage site is still under investigation.

References

External links

 Kalde gufs fra fortiden 

Nazi war crimes
Ullensaker
Military history of Norway during World War II